Süleyman Mustafa Karadeniz (born 12 July 1995) is a Turkish freestyle wrestler. He won the gold medal in the 92 kg event at the 2020 European Wrestling Championships held in Rome, Italy.

Career 

In 2019, he competed in the men's freestyle event of the 2019 Wrestling World Cup. In the same year, he also competed at the 2019 World Wrestling Championships held in Nur-Sultan, Kazakhstan in the 92 kg event without winning a medal. He won his first match against Shamil Zubairov of Azerbaijan but lost his next match against Alikhan Zhabrailov of Russia. Zhabrailov went on to win one of the bronze medals.

In 2020, he won one of the bronze medals in the men's 97 kg event at the Individual Wrestling World Cup held in Belgrade, Serbia. In March 2021, he qualified at the European Qualification Tournament to compete at the 2020 Summer Olympics in Tokyo, Japan. A month later, he secured the silver medal in the 97 kg event at the 2021 European Wrestling Championships held in Warsaw, Poland.

Achievements

References

External links 

 

Living people
1995 births
Place of birth missing (living people)
Turkish male sport wrestlers
European Wrestling Championships medalists
Wrestlers at the 2020 Summer Olympics
Olympic wrestlers of Turkey
European Wrestling Champions
21st-century Turkish people